The 1949 Detroit Lions season was their 20th in the league. The team improved on their previous season's output of 2–10, winning four games. They failed to qualify for the playoffs for the 14th consecutive season.

Schedule

Note: Intra-division opponents are in bold text.

Standings

References

External links
1949 Detroit Lions at Pro Football Reference
1949 Detroit Lions at jt-sw.com

Detroit Lions seasons
Detroit Lions
Detroit Lions